The Belize Progressive Party (BPP) is a Belizean political party founded in 2015 by a merger of several extra-parliamentary opposition groups. The BPP made its electoral debut in the November 2015 general election, in which it fielded 25 candidates and captured 1.63 percent of the vote nationwide (2,336 votes).

The BPP supports a republic in Belize.

References

External links
  

Political parties established in 2015
Political parties in Belize
2015 establishments in Belize
Republicanism in Belize